Marines, or naval infantry, are typically a military force trained to operate in littoral zones in support of naval operations. Historically, tasks undertaken by marines have included helping maintain discipline and order aboard the ship (reflecting the pressed nature of the ship's company and the risk of mutiny), the boarding of vessels during combat or capture of prize ships, and providing manpower for raiding ashore in support of the naval objectives. In most countries, the marines are an integral part of that state's navy.

The exact term "marine" does not exist in many languages other than English. The word marine means "navy" in many European languages such as Dutch, French, German, Italian and Norwegian.

History

In the earliest day of naval warfare, there was little distinction between sailors and soldiers on a warship. The oarsmen of Ancient Greek and Ancient Roman ships had to be capable of fighting the rowers of opposing ships hand-to-hand; though hoplites began appearing on Greek ships specifically for the boarding of enemy ships.

The Roman Republic was the first to understand the importance of professional soldiers dedicated to melee combat onboard of ships. During the First Punic War, Roman crews remained inferior in naval experience to the Carthaginians and could not hope to match them in naval tactics, which required great fleet maneuverability and tactical experience. The Romans therefore employed a novel weapon which changed sea warfare to their advantage — they equipped their ships with the corvus, a long pivoting plank with a beak-like spike on the underside for hooking onto enemy ships, possibly developed earlier by the Syracusans against the Athenians during the Sicilian Expedition of the Peloponnesian War. Using it as a boarding bridge, Roman infantrymen were able to invade an enemy ship, transforming sea combat into a version of land combat, where the Roman legionaries had the upper hand. The Roman Navy's two fleet legions, I Adiutrix and II Adiutrix, were among the first distinct naval infantry units.

The first organized marine corps was created in Venice by the Doge Enrico Dandolo when he created the first regiment of ten companies spread on several ships. That Corps participated to the conquest of Byzantium (1203-1204), later officially called "Fanti da Mar" (sea infantry) in 1550.

Etymology

The English noun marine is from the adjective marine, meaning "of the sea", via French  ("of the sea") from Latin  ("of the sea") itself from mare ("sea"), from Proto-Indo-European *móri ("body of water, lake") (cognate with Old English mere ("sea, lake"), Dutch , German , all from Proto-Germanic *mari).

The word marine was originally used for the marine-type forces of England; however, in many European languages the word marine or marina means "navy" – for example, in Dutch, French, Italian, German, Spanish, Danish, and Norwegian.
Because of this use of "marine" to mean "navy", exact one-word translations for the English term "Marines" do not exist in many other languages, which can lead to misunderstandings when translating, with the notable exception of the Dutch word . Typically, marine forces in non-English speaking countries have names that translate in English to naval infantry or coastal infantry. In French-speaking countries, two phrases exist which could be translated as marine, "" and ""; similar phrases exist elsewhere, e.g., in Portuguese .

Roles

The principal role of marine troops is military operations in the littoral zone; operating from ships they are trained to land on and secure key points to around 85 km (or 50 miles) inland, or as far as ship borne logistics can provide.

Marine units primarily deploy from warships using boats, landing craft, hovercraft, amphibious vehicles or helicopters. Specialist units are also trained in combat diving/combat swimming and parachuting.

As well as amphibious operations, marine troops are used in a variety of other, naval roles. Stationed at naval bases or forming marine detachments on board naval ships, they also conduct small scale raiding, maritime boarding operations, security of naval vessels and bases, riverine and coastal missions, mess duty, and field day operations.

In addition to their primary roles, they perform other tasks, including special operations and land warfare, separate from naval operations; ceremonial duties and miscellaneous other tasks as directed by governments.

By country

Algeria 
The Marine Fusilier Regiments are the marine infantry regiments of the Algerian Navy and they are specialised in amphibious warfare.

The RFM have about 7000 soldiers in their ranks. Established in 1985.

Argentina
The Argentine Marine Corps ( or IMARA) is a part of the Argentine Navy. Argentine marines have the same rank insignia and titles as the rest of the navy. The Argentine Marine Corps dates from 1827 when a single infantry battalion was raised. This was expanded in 1880 but seven years later the corps was merged with the existing coast artillery, to form a Naval Artillery Regiment. A series of reorganizations followed until responsibility for coastal defense was passed to the Argentine Army in 1898. Between 1935 and 1938 the marines reappeared in the form of five battalions of Marine Infantry, serving both on board ship and in coastal defense fortifications. In 1968 the Infanteria de Marina was reorganized as a separate corps within the Navy.

Australia
The marine and naval infantry designations are not applied to Australian Defence Force units, although some Australian Army units specialise in amphibious warfare, including 2nd Battalion, Royal Australian Regiment which has provided an amphibious light infantry role from 2012.

Bahamas
The Royal Bahamas Defence Force (RBDF) is the navy of The Bahamas. Since the Bahamas does not have an army or an air force, its navy composes the entirety of its armed forces. The RBDF Commando Squadron is a sizable force of 500 Special Marine Commandos.

Bangladesh
The Special warfare Driving and Salvage (SWADS) is special operations force of the Bangladesh Navy. SWADS is trained for the role of naval infantry and it consists of elite soldiers specially chosen form the national armed forces branches. They receive special training in United States, South Korea and Turkey.

Bolivia

The Bolivian Naval Force includes about 2,000 naval infantry personnel and marines. These are organized into seven small battalions.

Brazil

The Corps of Naval Fusiliers is subordinate to the Brazilian Navy. The marine corps is composed of an operational brigade and some guard and ceremonial duty battalions. The main unit is the brigade-sized  (Amphibious Division). Officers´ ranks and titles are the same as for the rest of the Navy.

Cambodia
During the 1970-75 Cambodian Civil War the Cambodian Marine Corps were active, but were effectively disbanded by the end of the Cambodian–Vietnamese War. The Royal Cambodian Navy created a force of 2,000 marines in 2007.

Canada
Canada had a history of participating in amphibious operations such as the Normandy landings and the Allied invasion of Sicily. Even though Canada does not have a marine corps, it has units that can carry out Marines-type operations, such as: an amphibious-operations trained company of the 3rd Battalion of the Royal 22nd Regiment, JTF2 that specializes in combat diving and amphibious reconnaissance, the Naval Tactical Operations Group that specializes in maritime interdiction, and the Naval Security Team that can provide force protection for amphibious forces.

Chile

The 4,200 strong Chilean Marine Corps is a branch of the Chilean Navy. Specialized in amphibious assaults, the corps is built around four detachments based along Chile's long coasts at Viña del Mar, Talcahuano, Punta Arenas and Iquique. There are also a number of independent companies and platoons, for security protection at naval bases, other shore installations and the Ministry of Defense. The Viña del Mar and Talcahuano detachments contribute to the Amphibious Expeditionary Brigade (Brigada Anfibia Expedicionaria). There is as a group of Marine Infantry commandos (Grupo de Comandos IM), which together with the group of naval tactical divers (Agrupación de Buzos Tácticos) are part of the Navy's Special Operations Command (Comando de Operaciones Especiales).

China (PRC)

The People's Liberation Army Navy Marine Corps (PLANMC) is a service branch of the PRC navy, and is therefore under the command of the PLAN Headquarters. The PLANMC are divided into six brigades. The majority of the PLAMC's personnel is based in the South China Sea.

Colombia
The Colombian Marine Corps is a part of the Colombian Navy. The modern Marine Corps dates from the establishment of two rifle companies in 1936. While remaining a small force the corps saw service during the civil war between Conservatives and Liberals of 1946–58; and provided volunteers for service in the Korean War. By the 1960s it had been expanded to a battalion of marine infantry plus five independent companies.

Croatia
Croatian Navy formed naval infantry companies during the Croatian War of Independence (1991-5), esp. on islands (Hvar: Zvir Company, Korčula: Mixed Detachment etc.) and one in Pula (Vanga Company, saw action in relieving Siege of Dubrovnik and in Operation Maslenica). As they were all dissolved during 2000s, a new naval infantry company, ~160-strong was formed again in 2018 as a part of the Navy Flotilla and is located in Ploče.

Cuba
The Cuban Revolutionary Navy ( or MGR) maintains a small marine battalion called the Desembarco de Granma.

Denmark
The Guard Hussar Regiment ( or GHR) maintains a marine squadron based in Almegårds Kaserne on the Baltic island Bornholm. The squadron is a part of the 3rd Light Reconnaissance Battalion and trains conscripts.

Ecuador
The 5,000-man Ecuadorian Navy maintains a 1,700-man Naval Infantry Corps headquartered in Guayaquil. Formed on 12 November 1962, it is organised into two security battalions, one in the Amazon River area and the other on the Pacific coast. There is also a commando battalion based on the Galápagos Islands.

Egypt
The 111th Independent Mechanized Brigade (formerly the 130th Marine Amphibious Brigade) of the Egyptian Army can conduct amphibious assault operations. There is also the 153rd Commando Group with three Marine Commandos Battalions (515th, 616th, 818th) controlling 12 Marine Commandos Companies.

El Salvador
The El Salvador Navy included two 600-man Marine Infantry Battalions ( or BIM), and a 300-man Naval Commando Force. The BIMs were located at La Unión and Usulután. The Salvadoran Marine Corps uses green pixelated and green woodland uniforms.

Finland

The Brigade is part of the Finnish Navy, and the only Swedish-speaking unit within the Finnish Defence Forces.

France

The  protect vessels and installations, provide the navy with military training, augment boarding-landing parties and support operations of the Commandos Marine. The  (Naval Commandos) are a seven company Commando formation whose roots can be traced to the Second World War. The Commandos Marine have evolved to be broadly comparable to the British Special Boat Service, with whom they exchange officers.
 ("Marine Troops"), are a branch of the French Army, renamed from the Troupes Coloniales who served in France's overseas territories to maintain or expand French interests. The modern Troupes de Marine have units permanently based in Africa, in addition they man bases in the French Overseas Territories. They now provide the ground combat elements of French amphibious task forces and are specifically trained for that purpose. The 9th Marine Brigade (9e Brigade Légère Blindée de Marine (9 BLBMa)) is twinned with the 3 Commando Brigade of the Royal Marines, organising the exchange of officers and sharing training and exercises.

Germany

The Sea Battalion is a land formation of the German Navy. It was formed in Eckernförde on 1 April 2014, succeeding the Naval Protection Force.

Greece
The Greek 32nd Marine Brigade "Moravas" and the Amphibious Raider Squadrons (known as MAK) of the 13th Special Operations Command are amphibious infantry and maritime operations units maintained by the Hellenic Army and supported by the Hellenic Navy.

Honduras
The Honduran Navy established at least one 600-man marine infantry battalion ( or BIM) in 1982.

India

The Indian Army has amphibious units under the Jodhpur-based corps. The MARCOS are the special forces of Indian Navy similar to the US Navy Seals.

Indonesia

In Indonesia, the main amphibious warfare force and naval infantry of the Indonesian National Armed Forces is the Indonesian Marine Corps of the Indonesian Navy. The Marine commandant reports to the Chief of Staff of the Indonesian Navy.

Iran

Since the Iranian Revolution in 1979, the number of marines in the Islamic Republic of Iran Navy (IRIN) has expanded to 2,600 personnel, in two marine brigades, each composed of three battalions. Their mission is to provide security throughout the Arabian Sea and free waters, as well as securing routes for Iranian ships in the Gulf of Aden. 

The Navy of the Islamic Revolutionary Guard Corps (IRGCN) maintains several units which may perform marine-type functions. It also has a Takavar naval commando battalion, called Sepah Navy Special Force (SNSF). They are tasked with providing security in the Persian Gulf and Strait of Hormuz, as well as conducting anti-piracy missions to assist Iranian ships.

Iraq
The Iraqi Navy is a small force with 1,500 sailors and 800 marines designed to protect the shoreline and inland waterways from insurgent infiltration. The navy will have coastal patrol squadrons, assault boat squadrons and a marine battalion. The force will consist of 2,000 to 2,500 sailors by 2010.

Israel
Upon its revival in the 1980s the Givati Brigade was intended to serve as the amphibious infantry brigade of the Israel Defense Forces, but this was not put into effect. Currently the 35th Paratroopers Brigade is the only brigade that has amphibious abilities as part of its Depth Warfare arsenal together with parachuting and air assault.

Italy

The San Marco Marine Brigade is the marine infantry unit of the Italian Navy.
The Serenissima Regiment is the amphibious infantry unit of the Italian Army. Its soldiers are called  and they are the Italian Army Marines.

Japan

Japan Ground Self-Defense Force
Amphibious Rapid Deployment Brigade – Japanese marines tasked with offensive amphibious assault to retake islands.

Korea, South
The Republic of Korea Marine Corps is the marine corps of South Korea. It was founded as a reconnaissance force just prior to the start of the Korean War. The ROKMC has seen action in several major conflicts. Though theoretically it is under the direction of the Chief of Naval Operations for all practical purposes it operates as an independent branch of the military.

Korea, North
The Korean People's Army's Light Infantry Training Guidance Bureau has two or more amphibious light infantry/sniper brigades. These brigades are believed deployed to Wonsan on the east coast and Namp'o and Tasa-ri on the west coast. In organization and manpower, they are reduced versions of the regular light infantry brigades with a total strength of approximately 5,000 men organized into ten battalions. Each battalion has about 400 men organized into five companies each. Some amphibious brigade personnel are trained as frogmen.

Lebanon
Lebanon maintains an elite but very small in number "Navy Commando" regiment. Trained internationally and armed with mostly American and French made equipment and weaponry.

Maldives

The Maldives National Defence Force maintains a frontline ground combat force known as the MNDF Marine Corps. It is divided into Marine Deployment Units (MDUs) which acts as the force projection element MNDF. The MNDF Marine Corps, as a naval unit, works closely with the Coast Guard of the country.

Mexico

The Mexican Naval Infantry of the Mexican Navy is responsible for port security, protection of the ten-kilometer coastal fringe, and patrolling major waterways. The marines have light arms, heavy weapons and armored amphibious vehicles. The Navy ceded most of its riverine responsibilities to the Army, reducing the size of the marine force, and deploying them back aboard ships where they play a vital role in drug interdiction and boarding of suspect vessels in territorial waters.

Morocco
The Royal Moroccan Marines are a naval infantry force subordinated to the Royal Moroccan Navy trained in landing missions and sabotage. The force is between 1,500 and 2,000 troops strong, organized in three battalion-strength units. Among its roles are guarding the southern coast against infiltration by Polisario Front guerrillas.

Myanmar
The Myanmar Navy raised a naval infantry battalion of 800 men in 1964, followed by a second battalion in 1967. Two more battalions may have also been raised. They were deployed mainly to the Arakan and Tenasserim areas, and to the Irrawaddy delta, to assist in counter-insurgency operations, but also performed other security duties.

Namibia
Namibian Marine Corps is a battalion-sized infantry unit of the Namibian Navy under the command of a naval captain. Its officers and men are part of the navy and use naval ranks though insignia is adopted from Brazilian Marine Corps, The Corps is primarily formed up of a Rapid Reaction Unit, Operation Dive team, Operational boat team and a Special Operations Commando Unit.

Netherlands
The Royal Netherlands Navy naval infantry unit is the Netherlands Marine Corps, founded in 1665 as an infantry regiment to the Dutch Navy. They saw their first amphibious action in 1667 raiding the English coast during the Raid on the Medway. Their Latin motto is Qua Patet Orbis ("As Far as the World Extends"). Today, it is a brigade approximately 2300 marines strong, consisting of two marine infantry battalions (plus one infantry company which is stationed in Aruba), one amphibious combat support battalion and one logistical battalion. Dutch Marines train in all possible geographical and climate conditions for their role. Enlisted marine recruit training lasts 33 weeks, and marine officers train up to 18 months (including naval academy time). It has its own Special Forces branch known as Netherlands Maritime Special Operations Forces (NLMARSOF).

Norway
The Coastal Ranger Command ( or KJK) of the Norwegian Navy is an amphibious infantry unit trained to operate in littoral combat theatres, as naval infantry and coastal artillery.

Pakistan

The Pakistan Marines division of the Pakistan Navy was re-established on April 14, 1990, with about 3,600 men. The marines are based at PNS Qasim naval base.

Paraguay
The Paraguayan Marine Corps is a battalion-sized organization consisting of four company sized brigades. In limited cadre form the Marine Corps dates from the late 19th century, although it only achieved significant existence when the three-battalion sized  was created in the final stages of the Chaco War of 1932–1935.

Peru
The Peruvian Naval Infantry consists of around 3,000 naval infantrymen and includes an amphibious brigade of three battalions and local security units with two transport ships, four tank landing ships, and about forty Chaimite armored personnel carriers. Since 1982, IMAP detachments have been deployed, under army command, in counter-insurgency operations.

Philippines

The Philippine Marine Corps (PMC) is the marine corps of the Philippines, it is a naval infantry force under the command of the Philippine Navy. PMC primarily conducts amphibious and expeditionary warfare, as well as special operation missions. It has a strength of about 9,500 men organized into three maneuver brigades, a Combat Service and Support Brigade (CSSB), and independent units such as the Marine Special Operations Group (MARSOG) and the Marine Security and Escort Group (MSEG). Formed on November 7, 1950, the Philippine Marine Corps is considered the first and foremost unit to be involved in any amphibious or seaborne clashes.

Poland
The Polish Navy maintains several naval infantry units responsible for port and coastal security. The Polish Army maintains the 7th Coastal Defense Brigade, which bears traditions of the disbanded 7th Coastal Defence Division (the Blue Berets), therefore it is sometimes referred to as the Marines of Poland.  there are no plans by the Polish Army to create an active marine unit. Therefore, the 7th Brigade carries out only limited-scale exercises of amphibious assaults.

Portugal

The Corpo de Fuzileiros, meaning literally "Corps of Fusiliers,” are an Elite Infantry and Special Forces unit of the Portuguese Navy.

Romania
The 307th Marine Battalion is the light infantry/reconnaissance unit of the Romanian Naval Forces. It is located in Babadag, Tulcea County, and was formed in the mid-1970s for the defence of the Danube Delta and Romanian Black Sea shore.

Russia

The Russian Naval Infantry are the amphibious forces of the Russian Armed Forces. The Russian Navy also has the Russian commando frogmen, an elite unit for underwater reconnaissance and special operations.

Saudi Arabia
The Royal Saudi Navy maintains two, 1,500-man marine brigades consisting of three battalions each. The brigades are assigned to the Western Fleet headquartered in Jeddah and the Eastern Fleet headquartered in Jubail.

South Africa

South Africa has not had a dedicated marine branch of its military since the apartheid era. A close analogue would be the South African Navy's Maritime Reaction Squadron, a marine-type unit of four companies. Members are marines and use naval ranks. They are trained in infantry combat up to company sized operations. They are also used for crowd control and conduct peacekeeping operations. During peacekeeping operations they are meant to augment an army infantry battalion. Their role is very similar to the now disbanded South Africa Marine Corps from the apartheid era. The 4 Special Forces Regiment of the South African Special Forces provides South Africa its seaward Special Forces capability.

Spain

Sri Lanka

The Sri Lanka Navy established its Sri Lanka Marine Corps in November 2016 and the first group of members were assisted in training by the 11th Marine Expeditionary Unit of the United States Marine Corps. The unit became functional after the first group of members consisting of 6 officers and 158 sailors graduated from training on the 27th of February, 2017.

Sweden
The Swedish Amphibious Corps is an arm of the Swedish Navy. The Corps consists of two regiments each comprising one amphibious battalion, tasked with reconnaissance, amphibious assaults and combat on, over and under the surface of the sea.

Syria
The Fouj Al-Mughawayr Al-Bahir ( meaning "Marines Regiment") is a unit based in Latakia Governorate. It has participated in operations in the Syrian Civil War.

Taiwan (ROC)

With the size of about 9,000 personnel, the Taiwanese (Republic of China) Marine Corps is responsible for amphibious combat, counter-landing, and reinforcement of Taiwan and surrounding islands (such as Kinmen, Wuchiu, Matsu Islands, and Pratas Island, etc.), defense of Naval facilities, and also functions as a rapid reaction force (special service company) and a strategic reserve.

Thailand

Royal Thai Marine Corps (RTMC) is the naval infantry sub-branch of the Royal Thai Navy.The Royal Thai Marine Corps was founded in 1932, when the first battalion was formed with the assistance of the United States Marine Corps. It was expanded to a regiment in 1940 and was in action against communist guerrillas throughout the 1950s and 1960s. During the 1960s the United States Marine Corps assisted in its expansion into a brigade. The Royal Thai Marine Corps saw action on the Malaysian border in the 1970s, and has now been increased to four brigades.

Tonga 
The Royal Tongan Marines is a sub-unit of the Tongan Maritime Force, which itself is a branch of the Tonga Defence Services. It is a single battalion-sized group composed of a Headquarters Company and three Light Infantry Companies.

Turkey

The Amphibious Marine Infantry Brigade Command is the marine force of the Turkish Naval Forces and consists of 4,500 men based in Foça near İzmir.

Ukraine

The Ukrainian Marines was founded in 1993 from a unit of the former Soviet Naval Infantry. It serves as a coastal defense force of the Ukrainian Navy. Also known by its official name, the "Ukrainian Naval Infantry", the sub-branch of the Navy is based in Mykolaiv.

United Kingdom

The Royal Marines (RM) were formed in 1664 and are part of HM Naval Service. They include an amphibious brigade (which includes commando-trained units and individual personnel from the British Army, Royal Navy and Royal Air Force), a naval security unit responsible for guarding the UK's naval nuclear weapons and other security duties, a landing craft and boat-training group which is also a parent unit for three landing craft units deployed on amphibious warfare ships; and a naval musical branch. The RM has close international ties with allied marine forces, particularly the United States Marine Corps and the Netherlands Marine Corps/Korps Mariniers. "Marine" is also used as a rank in the Royal Marines, being equivalent to an army private. The Royal Marines Reserve (RMR) is the volunteer reserve force used to augment the regular Royal Marines in times of war or national crisis.

United States

The United States Marine Corps (USMC) is currently the only marine combined-arms force in the world. Created in 1775, it was originally intended only to guard naval vessels during the American Revolutionary War. The USMC is a component part of the US Department of the Navy in the military command structure, with its own representative on the Joint Chiefs of Staff. The Corps’ major functions include: seizure or defense of advanced naval bases and land operations essential to a naval campaign, providing detachments and organizations for service on armed vessels of the Navy and security detachments for the protection of naval property at naval stations and bases, and such other duties as the President may direct and develop those phases of amphibious operations that pertain to the tactics, technique, and equipment used by landing forces. It also has other missions, including providing personnel as security guards at US diplomatic missions, and providing helicopter transportation for the President of the United States aboard Marine One. The United States Marine Corps Reserve (USMCR) is the reserve force of the United States Marine Corps.

Uruguay
The Uruguayan Marine Corps ( or FUSNA) is a battalion-sized organization. However, given its small size, it's not a separate corps within the Navy, but regular naval officers are posted to the Marines as to any other Navy unit.

Venezuela
The Venezuelan Marine Corps is a sub-division of the Venezuelan Navy. Headquartered in Meseta de Mamo, Vargas, the estimated numerical strength of this unit is approximately 8,000 men and women. Its mission is to "enlist and direct its units in order to form the disembarking force and/or support of amphibious or special operations; executing naval safeguarding and environmental policing, as well as actively participating in the national development".

Vietnam
The Vietnam People's Navy maintains a naval infantry force. It once stood at eleven brigades each of several battalions. Currently the Vietnam People's Navy maintains two naval infantry brigades.

Historical marine forces

Ancient Greece
The ancient Greek states did not possess specialized marine infantry; instead, they used hoplites and archers as an onboard contingent.

Ancient Rome
The Roman Navy used regular infantry as marines. Naval personnel were trained for raiding and also provided the troops for at least two legions (I Adiutrix and II Adiutrix) for service on land. The various provincial fleets were usually provided with marines from the adjacent legions.

Australia
Several of the Colonial navies of Australia raised volunteer naval infantry and naval militia brigades in the second half of the 19th century. Following the Federation of Australia they were combined into the Commonwealth Naval Militia. With the formation of the Royal Australian Navy in 1911 they were renamed the Royal Australian Naval Brigade. At its peak in 1915 it numbered 2,817 officers and men. The Naval Brigade was disbanded in 1920 and volunteers were absorbed into the Royal Australian Naval Reserve.

Austrian/Austro-Hungarian Empire
Though overshadowed by its Prussian counterpart, the Marinier-Korps as well as naval powers like the British, the French, the Spanish, and the Italians, Austria-Hungary maintained a small regiment of naval infantrymen dating back to Venetian times alongside the then Austrian Imperial Navy's “Corps of Sailors”. However, in 1868, as part of his naval reforms, then Commander Wilhelm von Tegetthoff abolished the Naval Infantry Regiment and the Naval Artillery Corps in favor of an enlarged and all-encompassing  as no marines had served aboard a ship for 10 years, and so from that point on sailors not serving on active warships received infantry drills & took up naval infantry duties.

Byzantine Empire
For several centuries, the Byzantine navy used the descendants of the Mardaites, who were settled in southern Anatolia and Greece, as marines and rowers for its ships. Emperor Basil I also established a separate marine regiment, 4,000 strong, for the central Imperial Fleet based at Constantinople. These were professional troops, and were counted among the elite .
Despite the progressive decline and virtual disappearance of the navy, they remained active until the late Palaiologan period.

Denmark-Norway
 (The Marine Regiment) was the naval infantry of the Royal Dano-Norwegian Navy.

Dutch Republic
The Corps was founded on 10 December 1665 during the Second Anglo-Dutch War by the unofficial leader of the republic Johan de Witt and Admiral Michiel de Ruyter as the Regiment de Marine. Its leader was Willem Joseph Baron van Ghent. The Dutch had successfully used ordinary soldiers in ships at sea in the First Anglo-Dutch War. It was the fifth European marine unit formed, being preceded by the Spanish Marines (1537), the Portuguese Marines (1610), the French Marines (1622) and the English Royal Marines (1664). Like Britain, the Netherlands has had several periods when its Marines were disbanded. The Netherlands itself was under French occupation or control from 1810 until 1813. The modern  dates from 1814, receiving its current name in 1817.

The battle honors on the ' colors are: Raid on the Medway (1667), Kijkduin (1673), Sennefe (1674), Spain, Dogger Bank (1781), West Indies, Algiers (1816), Atjeh, Bali, Rotterdam (1940), Java Sea (1942), Java and Madoera (1947–1948), New Guinea (1962) and Cambodia (1992–1993).

Estonia
The , was a short-lived infantry battalion of the Estonian Navy. The battalion was created in 1919 from the crews of the Estonian surface warships and was based in Tallinn. The unit was mainly used on the Southern Front during the Estonian War of Independence. The unit was operational from March to June in 1919.

France

The Troupes de marine were founded in 1622 (as ) as land forces under the control of the Secretary of State of the Navy, notably for operations in French Canada. The  were transformed in line infantry regiments by Napoleon, but became once more marine forces in 1822 (for the artillery) and 1831 (for the infantry). These  were in the 19th century the main overseas and colonial forces of the French military. Throughout these changes in title, these troops continued to be part of the French Army.

Gran Colombia
The Federation of Gran Colombia Marines were formed in 1822 and were disbanded in 1829, Personnel were mostly from Venezuela.

Germany
German Empire: During the German Imperial era, three ‘sea battalions’ or  based at Kiel, Wilhelmshaven and Tsingtao were maintained. These units served intermittently as colonial intervention forces. The  at the imperial navy's east Asian station at Tsingtao was the only all-German unit with permanent status in a protectorate/colony. The battalion fought at the Siege of Tsingtao.
East Germany: The East German army's Nr29. Regiment ("Ernst Moritz Arndt") was a Motorized Rifle Regiment intended for amphibious operations in the Baltic Sea; while the : Combat swimmer units were intended for support of amphibious operations and for raiding.

Iran
At the time of the Iranian Revolution in 1979, the Imperial Iranian Navy had three battalions of marines.

Iraq
The old Ba'athist-era Iraqi Navy maintained several marine companies.
The Iraqi Republican Guard maintained a Marine Brigade as part of its 8th As Saiqa Special Forces Division. The brigade was equipped with Brazilian-made Engesa EE-11 Urutu wheeled armored personnel carriers.

Fascist Italy
The Blackshirt militia maintained an independent Marine Group with four MVSN battalions (24th, 25th, 50th and 60th).

Imperial Japan

During the feudal period, the Japanese used Ashigaru soldiers or regular Yumi archers as soldiers to protect ships from pirates.
In 1873 a short-lived marine corps was added to the newly created Imperial Japanese Navy, using Britain's Royal Marines as a model. Considered unsuitable in its original form, the force was disbanded in 1878.
The Imperial Japanese Navy's Land Forces maintained several combat units:
Special Naval Landing Forces were the Empire of Japan's Marine Corps.
The IJN also maintained the Guard Forces and Defense Units, both of whom also received amphibious assault and beach defence training. However, their performance was poor or average when they were used as assault troops.
The Imperial Japanese Army's 3,500 man Sea-Landing Brigades (1st to 4th) were used to conduct amphibious assaults on an island, but afterwards they stayed to garrison that island.

The Khmer Republic
The Cambodian Marine Corps or Corps de Fusiliers-Marins Khmères (CFMK) were the Marine Corps of the Khmer Republic of 1970–1975 under the Khmer National Navy as part of the Khmer National Armed Forces.

They took part in the Cambodian Civil War against the Khmer Rouge but was dissolved along with the rest of the Khmer National Armed Forces when the Khmer Republic were defeated and capitulated to the Khmer Rouge.

Ottoman Empire

The role of Ottoman naval infantry originated in Orhan's conquest of the Karasi Beylik and the capture of its fleet. From then on, Janissaries and Azaps were sometimes deployed as marines during the 14th Century. The Deniz azaps were used during the 16th Century; while troops called Levend (Bahriyeli) were raised on and off over the centuries – over 50,000 of them by the late 18th century. Ottoman marines were part of the Ottoman navy.

Portuguese Empire
Portugal raised numerous companies of Special Marines and African Special Marines, both at home and in the African colonies of Portuguese Guinea, Portuguese Angola and Portuguese Mozambique, for service in Africa during the Portuguese Colonial Wars. The African Special Marines were all-black units.

Russian Empire
The Imperial Russian Navy used several regiments of marine equipage troops that fought as much on land as they served in ship detachments. One battalion was formed within the Guard, and served on the Imperial family's ships.

Spain
The oldest naval infantry. Created 27 February 1537 as Tercio de Armada by Carlos I (Charles V, Holy Roman Emperor 1519–1556). Miguel de Cervantes, famous writer, was a member of naval infantry at Lepanto Battle.

Soviet Union

The Soviet Navy had a number of small battalion-sized naval infantry and coastal defence units that mostly served in the ports and bases before the Second World War. During the war, and building on the visuals of the mutinied sailors of Petrograd in 1917, the Stavka ordered formation of naval infantry brigades from surplus ship crew or shore duty sailors.

South Africa
The South Africa Marine Corps was set up as a sub-branch of the South African Navy in 1979, with the primary purpose of protecting harbours. The Marines were disbanded in 1989, following a major restructuring of the Navy at the end of the South African Border War.

United Arab Emirates
In 2011 the UAE Marine Battalion was merged in the United Arab Emirates Presidential Guard.

United Kingdom
 The Royal Marines date from the establishment of a Maritime Regiment of Foot in 1664. The Marine Regiments for Sea were formed in 1702 but by 1713 they had been disbanded or taken into the army as regiments of foot. In 1755, a permanent Corps of marine companies was established for direct service under the Admiralty and this force has an unbroken descent to the Royal Marines of today.
 The Royal Navy has since its beginning formed naval landing parties of seamen for action ashore, this being later formalised into the Naval Brigades. These brigades would often dismount guns from their parent vessels for use ashore, these guns often being the only artillery available. The most famous example of this form of land service was provided by the guns accompanying the forces relieving Ladysmith.
 The Corps of Colonial Marines were raised from former American slaves as auxiliary units of the Royal Marines for service in the Americas: Two of these units were raised and subsequently disbanded. The first was a small unit which existed from 1808 to 12 October 1810, the second was more substantial and existed from May 1814 to 20 August 1816.
 The Royal Naval Division was part of the Royal Navy in the First World War. In 1914, the shortage of ground forces for the Western Front led to the creation of the Division, composed of two brigades of sailors and a brigade formed by the Royal Marines. The Division was part of the Royal Navy but for command purposes was integrated into the army's command structure. The sailors were initially disappointing as infantry, but eventually developed into one of the better divisions. The Division participated in the defence of the Belgian city of Antwerp in late 1914, and then served with heavy casualties at the Battle of Gallipoli. At different times the Division included various army units. The division ceased to exist after the end of the First World War.
 Gooch's Marines, the 61st Foot, raised in the American colonies for the War of Jenkins' Ear in 1739. This was a 3,000 man American regiment of the British Army that served alongside British Marines. Among its officers was Lawrence Washington, half-brother of George Washington. It was disbanded as a regiment in 1742 and the remaining independent companies were merged with another regiment in 1746.

United States
 American Colonial Marines were State Marines raised for the various state navies that came into existence shortly before the Revolutionary War.
 The Continental Marines were the marine force of the American Colonies during American Revolutionary War. The Corps was formed by the Continental Congress on November 10, 1775, and was disbanded in 1783. The Continental Marines' first and only Commandant was Captain Samuel Nicholas.
 Hillet Marine River Regiment of the Union Army during the American Civil War, this regiment consisted of 10 rifle companies, a Cavalry Battalion of 5 companies, and an artillery battalion of three batteries, all of whom operated from Mississippi River gunboats as part of the Mississippi River Squadron.
 The Republic of Texas Marine Corps – Although a marine corps was suggested in the "Act and Decree Establishing a Navy," passed on November 25, 1835, it was not until acting governor James W. Robinson strongly urged the swift formation of such an organization in his message to the General Council on January 14, 1836, that steps were actually taken to commission officers of marines and recruit enlisted personnel. Before the end of the Republic of Texas and annexation to the United States, more than 350 men served with the Texas Marine Corps, and at least eighteen officers were commissioned to command them. The Texas Marine Corps served under the direction of the Navy Department of the Republic, and the duties of the corps were specifically ordained in fifteen articles passed by the Texas Congress on December 13, 1836. Marines served under their own officers aboard ship and ashore but were subject to the orders of the senior naval officer present. The uniform of the Texas Marine came from discontinued USMC stocks, changing only the buttons and cap devices to those of Texas configuration.
 The Confederate Marines were a branch of the Confederate States Navy and was established by the Confederate Congress on 16 March 1861; they were mainly (80%) defectors from the US Marines.

Vietnam

Vietnamese dynasties had a long tradition of utilizing marines. This tradition went back no later than the Annam Protectorate of Tang dynasty when the governors built boats and trained marines to fight off pirates and invaders. The successive Vietnamese dynasties made full use of their marines' superiority at river and sea to launch successful campaigns against their northward and southward neighbors alike.

The forerunner of the Republic of Vietnam Marine Corps (VNMC) was established by Ngo Dinh Diem, then prime minister of what was then the State of Vietnam on October 13, 1954. The VNMC became defunct on 1 May 1975 after the fall of Saigon.

Yugoslavia
The 12th Naval Infantry Brigade of the Yugoslavian Navy consisted of 900 to 2,000 men in three battalions. A multi-ethnic unit, the brigade was broken up during the dissolution of the Yugoslav federation and saw little action.

See also

List of marines and naval infantry forces
Combat diver
Air force infantry
Navy

References

External links

 
Types of military forces
Lists of military units and formations